Heliodorus vexillifer is a Nearctic species of tachinid flies in the genus Heliodorus of the family Tachinidae.

Distribution
Nearctic: United States.

References

Diptera of North America
Exoristinae
Insects described in 1964